Cecil Bishopp may refer to:

Sir Cecil Bishopp, 4th Baronet (1635–1705), MP for Bramber
Sir Cecil Bishopp, 5th Baronet (died 1725), of the Bishopp baronets
Sir Cecil Bishopp, 6th Baronet (1700–1778), MP for Penryn
Sir Cecil Bishopp, 7th Baronet (died 1779), of the Bishopp baronets
Cecil Bisshopp, 12th Baron Zouche (1752–1828), of the Bishopp baronets, MP for New Shoreham, Baron Zouche
Sir Cecil Bisshopp, 10th Baronet (1821–1849), of the Bishopp baronets

See also
Cecil Bishop (disambiguation)
Bishopp (surname)